Mattie may refer to:

 Mattie (name), a list of people and fictional characters with the given name or nickname
 Mattie, Piedmont, Italy, a municipality
 Mattie, West Virginia, United States, a ghost town
 Grace Bailey (schooner), known as Mattie for many years

See also
 Matty (disambiguation)
 Matti (disambiguation)